La Chingada is a town in the municipality of Perote in the Mexican state of Veracruz.

The place is famous for its name, the Mexican Spanish vulgarism La Chingada. It means, roughly, 'the fucked', a vulgar but common reference to La Malinche, the Nahua interpreter of Hernán Cortés, the Spanish conquistador who conquered Mexico. The term "La Chingada" is used in a variety of mostly offensive or vulgar meanings, Vete a la Chingada means, for example something like 'go to hell'.

Although there are several places in Mexico called La Chingada, this is the best known.

External links 
 Guía para llegar a La Chingada! (Spanish)

Populated places in Veracruz